Legislative Assembly elections were held in Himachal Pradesh in 1985. As of 2022, this is the last time an incumbent party retained control of the legislative assembly in Himachal Pradesh.

Results

Source: STATISTICAL REPORT ON GENERAL ELECTION, 1985 TO THE LEGISLATIVE ASSEMBLY OF HIMACHAL PRADESH

Constituency wise Results

References

External links
 Chief Electoral Officer, Himachal Pradesh

 State Assembly elections in Himachal Pradesh
1980s in Himachal Pradesh
Himachal Pradesh